The Rapture is a Big Finish Productions audio drama based on the long-running British science fiction television series Doctor Who.

Plot
The Seventh Doctor and Ace visit The Rapture nightclub in Ibiza in 1997, where two angels are brainwashing clubgoers, and Ace discovers a secret about her family.

Continuity
 This story gives Ace's date of birth as 20 August 1970.
 Ace's parents are named as Audrey and Harry McShane.
 This story introduces Ace's brother, Liam McShane, who is four years her junior.
 Following on from tie-in novels, Ace's full name is given as Dorothy Gale McShane (Although, this was never given in the original series).
 Ace refers to the events of The Curse of Fenric and Colditz

Cast
The Doctor — Sylvester McCoy
Ace — Sophie Aldred
Himself — Tony Blackburn
Liam — David John
Caitriona — Anne Bird
Brian — James Daniel Wilson
Gustavo — Carlos Riera
Jude — Matthew Brenher
Gabriel — Neil Henry
Bouncer — Jeremy James

Dating error
At one point in episode 4, the date is given as 'Saturday 15 May 1997'. In reality, 15 May 1997 fell on a Thursday.

External links
Big Finish Productions – The Rapture

2002 audio plays
Seventh Doctor audio plays
Fiction set in 1997